James W. Hicks was a college football player for the Alabama Crimson Tide of the University of Alabama from 1912 to 1914. He was selected All-Southern in 1914. Coach D. V. Graves said of his player Hicks: "There is no other guard down here who can break through the line and run down under punts as Hicks has done all the year."

References

American football guards
All-Southern college football players
Alabama Crimson Tide football players